Abu'l-Hasan Ali ibn Muhammad al-Iyadi al-Tunisi (died 976) was a 10th-century Maghrebi Arabic poet in the service of the Fatimid caliphs al-Qa'im, al-Mansur, and al-Mu'izz. 

His exact origin is unknown. The nisba "al-Tunisi" has led to suggestions that he was born in Tunis, but his other nisba of "al-Iyadi" suggests ties to the Iyad, a clan of the Arab Banu Hilal tribe settled near Msila. Pro-Shi'ite, he was court poet of the Isma'ili Shi'a caliphs al-Qa'im, al-Mansur, and al-Mu'izz. His reputation during his lifetime was considerable, and he was highly regarded by later critics. However, possibly due to his pro-Shi'a partisanship, which may have led to an attempted damnatio memoriae after the Zirid dynasty turned to Sunni Islam, or due to shifting literary tastes, none of his works survives in complete form. His work survives mostly in fragments that were appreciated and gathered together by later anthologists for their vivid and evocative language, such as descriptions of the Fatimid navy, a galloping horse, or the so-called Lake Palace in the palace city of Mansuriya. The only evidently pro-Shi'a works surviving are a eulogy for al-Mansur, and a moving description of the end of the famous anti-Fatimid rebel Abu Yazid. Al-Iyadi died in 976, probably in Cairo, where he had followed the Fatimid court following the Fatimid conquest of Egypt in 969.

References

Sources
 

976 deaths
10th-century Arabs
10th-century people from the Fatimid Caliphate
10th-century people of Ifriqiya
10th-century Arabic poets
Poets from the Fatimid Caliphate